Claryville is an unincorporated community in Bois Brule Township in Perry County, Missouri, United States. It is located twelve miles northeast of Perryville, sixty-three miles south of Saint Louis, and lies directly on the Mississippi River.

Etymology

The spelling of the name was first Clearyville, as it was named for John Cleary, a nearby farmer.  The name was eventually changed to correspond to the pronunciation.  Claryville was also known unofficially as West Chester.

***New information has been made available from the U.S. Department of the interior Bureau of Land Management General Land Office Records. The new information shows that the historians were incorrect about the original spelling of not only of the town but also John's surname. He was in fact John W. Clary.  This PDF file is a copy of the original document.

John W. Clary received the land for his service to the United States of America in the Mexican–American War, under the authority of the ScripWarrant Act of 1847 (9 Stat. 123) He was awarded the maximum amount of land, which was 160 acres, in his grant.

History 

Claryville was first settled in 1869, and the town was platted in 1871. The first mayor was V.P. Tucker and its first merchant was E. J. Rhodes. As of 1912, the town had three general stores and a population of 140. Subsequent floods over the years have diminished the town's population.

Geography

Claryville is situated in the Mississippi River Valley within an alluvial flood plain called the Bois Brule Bottom. Its location along the Mississippi River has made Claryville susceptible to flooding.

References 

Unincorporated communities in Perry County, Missouri
Missouri populated places on the Mississippi River
Unincorporated communities in Missouri